Phasmahyla timbo is a species of frog in the subfamily Phyllomedusinae. It is endemic to Brazil.

References

Phasmahyla
Endemic fauna of Brazil
Frogs of South America
Amphibians described in 2008